The Pender Formation is a geologic formation in British Columbia. It preserves fossils dating back to the Cretaceous period. Organisms that have been recovered from this formation include indeterminate Elasmosaurids, Mosasaurids, and a Chelonioidean, as well as the sea turtle Desmatochelys and the Mosasaurine Kourisodon.

See also

 List of fossiliferous stratigraphic units in British Columbia

References

References
 

Cretaceous British Columbia